Johannes Leak (born 25 October 1980) is a German-born Australian editorial cartoonist.

Life 
He is the son of cartoonist Bill Leak and Astrid. He lived in Dießen am Ammersee before moving to Australia. He attended Sydney Boys High School and then Julian Ashton Art School for five years on a scholarship.

Leak's August 2020 cartoon of Kamala Harris, the presumptive Democratic vice presidential nominee in the 2020 election was deemed as offensive and racist by a number of politicians and journalists. The cartoon had used Joe Biden's use of the phrase "little brown girls".

In February 2021, Leak was awarded a $40,000 contract from the Australian Department of Parliamentary Services to paint an official portrait of former prime minister Tony Abbott.

References

External links

Living people
1980 births
People from Landsberg (district)
Australian editorial cartoonists
The Australian journalists
21st-century Australian artists
Julian Ashton Art School alumni